Antonio Robles-Jimenez is a retired soccer player who played professionally in the USL A-League.

In 1998, Robles signed with the San Diego Flash of the USL A-League.  He was the league’s sixth leading scorer and was Second Team All League.  The Flash released Robles during the 2000 pre-season.  He then moved to the Riverside County Elite of the USL D-3 Pro League.2000  Riverside County Elite  17 (9)  In April 2001, Robles rejoined the Flash, but does not appear to have played for them.

References

Living people
1970 births
Riverside County Elite players
San Diego Flash players
A-League (1995–2004) players
USL Second Division players
Association football midfielders
American soccer players